Bodøgaard is a surname. Notable people with the surname include:

 Kristian Johan Bodøgaard (1885–1971), Norwegian politician
 Maria Bodøgaard (born 1983), Norwegian television presenter

See also
 Boogaard

Norwegian-language surnames